Loch Bhac (Bhaic or Vach) is a fine freshwater trout loch, located in the west part of the Allean Forest, and east part of Tay Forest park, and slightly north of Loch Tummel, within Perth and Kinross, Scotland. Loch Bhac sits on a south-west to north-east orientation.

References

Bhac
Bhac
Tay catchment